The Florida Atlantic Owls have two basketball programs:

Florida Atlantic Owls men's basketball
Florida Atlantic Owls women's basketball